Drimenol cyclase (farnesyl pyrophosphate:drimenol cyclase) is an enzyme with systematic name (2E,6E)-farnesyl-diphosphate diphosphohydrolase (drimenol-forming). This enzyme catalyses the following chemical reaction

 (2E,6E)-farnesyl diphosphate + H2O  drimenol + diphosphate

References

External links 
 

EC 3.1.7